Paraceratites is an extinct genus of ammonite cephalopods in the family Ceratitidae.

Species
 Paraceratites gabbi † Meek 1877
 Paraceratites binodosus † Hauer 1850
 Paraceratites brembanus † Mojsisovics 1882
 Paraceratites elegans † Mojsisovics 1882
 Paraceratites orientalis † Yabe and Shimizu 1927
 Paraceratites stecki † Silberling and Nichols 1982
 Paraceratites subnodosus † Mojsisovics 1882
 Paraceratites trinodosus † Mojsisovics 1882

Distribution
Fossils of Paraceratites are found in the Triassic marine strata throughout the world, including Bulgaria, Cambodia, China, Germany, Israel, Italy, Japan, Laos, Malaysia, Montenegro, Papua New Guinea, Russia, Serbia, Turkey, United States and Vietnam.

References

 The Paleobiology Database

Ceratitidae
Ceratitida genera
Triassic cephalopods
Ammonites of Europe
Fossils of Serbia